Lemon Township may refer to the following townships in the United States:

 Lemon Township, Butler County, Ohio,
 Lemon Township, Wyoming County, Pennsylvania